Kirovsky District is the name of several administrative and municipal divisions in Russia. The districts are generally named for Sergey Kirov, a Soviet statesman.

Districts of the federal subjects

Kirovsky District, Republic of Crimea, an administrative and municipal district in the Republic of Crimea
Kirovsky District, Kaluga Oblast, an administrative and municipal district of Kaluga Oblast
Kirovsky District, Leningrad Oblast, an administrative and municipal district of Leningrad Oblast
Kirovsky District, Republic of North Ossetia-Alania, an administrative and municipal district of the Republic of North Ossetia–Alania
Kirovsky District, Primorsky Krai, an administrative and municipal district of Primorsky Krai
Kirovsky District, Saint Petersburg, an administrative district of the federal city of Saint Petersburg
Kirovsky District, Stavropol Krai, an administrative and municipal district of Stavropol Krai

City divisions
, a city district of Astrakhan, the administrative center of Astrakhan Oblast
, a city district of Irkutsk, the administrative center of Irkutsk Oblast
Kirovsky City District, Kazan, a city district of Kazan, the capital of the Republic of Tatarstan
, a city district of Kemerovo, the administrative center of Kemerovo Oblast
, a city district of Khabarovsk, the administrative center of Khabarovsk Krai
, a city district of Krasnoyarsk, the administrative center of Krasnoyarsk Krai
, an administrative and municipal city district of Makhachkala, the capital of the Republic of Dagestan
Kirovsky City District, Novosibirsk, a city district of Novosibirsk, the administrative center of Novosibirsk Oblast
, an administrative okrug of the city of Omsk, the administrative center of Omsk Oblast
Kirovsky City District, Perm, a city district of Perm, the administrative center of Perm Krai
, a city district of Rostov-on-Don, the administrative center of Rostov Oblast
Kirovsky City District, Samara, an administrative and municipal city district of Samara, the administrative center of Samara Oblast
, a city district of Saratov, the administrative center of Saratov Oblast
, a city district of Tomsk, the administrative center of Tomsk Oblast
, a city district of Ufa, the capital of the Republic of Bashkortostan
, a city district of Volgograd, the administrative center of Volgograd Oblast
, a city district of Yaroslavl, the administrative center of Yaroslavl Oblast
, a city district of Yekaterinburg, the administrative center of Sverdlovsk Oblast

Historical districts
Kirovsky District, Murmansk Oblast (1935–1954), a district of Murmansk Okrug of Leningrad Oblast (1935–1938) and then of Murmansk Oblast (1938–1954)
Kirovsky District, Kalinin Oblast (1929–1963), a district of Rzhev Okrug of Western Oblast (1929–1935) and then of Kalinin Oblast (1938–1963). It was abolished in 1963 and re-established in 1965 as Selizharovsky District.

Historical city districts
Kirovsky City District, Murmansk, a city district of Murmansk, Murmansk Oblast, which existed in 1939–1948 and 1951–1958

See also
Kirovsky (disambiguation)
Kirov (disambiguation)

References

Notes

Sources